Raziabad (also Romanized as Raẕīābād) is a village in Hakimabad Rural District, in the Central District of Zarandieh County, Markazi Province, Iran. At the 2006 census, its population was 592, in 163 families.

References 

Populated places in Zarandieh County